General elections were held in Costa Rica on 7 December 1919. Julio Acosta García of the Constitutional Party won the presidential election, whilst the party also won the parliamentary election, in which they received 74.9% of the vote. Voter turnout was 57.8% in the presidential election and 42.1% in the parliamentary election.

These elections were held on December 7, 1919 after dictator Federico Tinoco was deposed and exiled. The winning candidate Acosta, former chancellor of the government overthrown by Tinoco, had been precisely one of his fierce opponents and leader of armed antitinoquist groups which earned him great popularity, this despite the fact that his affiliation as a Freemason and Theosophist were controversial, at least among some sectors of the Church.

The tinoquismo grouped around the recently founded Democratic Party and nominates Dr. José Maria Soto Alfaro, denoted tinoquista, twice deputy and brother of former president Bernardo Soto Alfaro. Soto was also the founder of the so-called «Club 27 de Enero» whose name commemorated the Tinoquista coup on January 27, 1917 that overthrew González Flores and was one of the supporters of the Tinoquista regime.

Results

President

By province

Parliament

References

1919 elections in Central America
1919 in Costa Rica
Elections in Costa Rica